Cole Christensen is an American politician serving as a member of the North Dakota House of Representatives from the 24th district. Elected in November 2020, he assumed office on December 1, 2020.

Early life and education 
Born in Jamestown, North Dakota, Christensen is a native of Rogers. He has three siblings. He attended the Association Free Lutheran College and Lynnes Welding Training.

Career 
Christensen has worked as a welder. He is also the manager of a seed plant. Christensen was elected to the North Dakota House of Representatives in November 2020 and assumed office on December 1, 2020. In May 2021, Christensen was selected as "Legislative Rookie of the Year" by fellow members of the House.

References 

Living people
People from Barnes County, North Dakota
Republican Party members of the North Dakota House of Representatives
People from Jamestown, North Dakota
Year of birth missing (living people)